Baitul Huda Mosque may refer to

Baitul Huda Mosque, Sydney, Australia
Baitul Huda Mosque, Usingen, Germany